Panasonic Lumix DMC-GF6 is a Micro Four Thirds digital camera by Panasonic Lumix with a 16 megapixel resolution sensor. It is the successor to the GF5. The GF6 adds Wi-Fi with NFC, a 180 degree tilting screen and a mode dial with a customizable lever. It also has an improved grip and better ISO performance when compared to its predecessor.
It comes bundled with the new Panasonic Lumix G Vario 14-42mm f/3.5–5.6 II Asph., Mega O.I.S., which boasts better build quality, a smaller design and improved sharpness.

Property
16 Megapixels Live MOS sensor and Venus Engine
Creative Panorama and Creative Control with 19 filters
Self Shot mode with 180° revolvable LCD screen
Wi-Fi and NFC for Smartphones
Full HD movies 1.920 x 1.080 with stereo sound

References

External links

GF6 at Panasonic.net
Panasonic Lumix GF6 review

GF6